Rui Manuel Guerreiro Nobre Esteves (born 30 January 1967) is a Portuguese retired professional footballer who played as an attacking midfielder.

He amassed Primeira Liga totals of 93 matches and five goals during five seasons, in representation of Farense, Vitória de Setúbal, Benfica and Belenenses.

Playing career
Born in Lisbon, Esteves started playing professionally at the age of 18, representing several teams in the Portuguese second division, most of them hailing from the Algarve region: S.C.U. Torreense, S.C. Olhanense and Louletano DC. His Primeira Liga debut occurred in the 1990–91 season, but he appeared just six times for S.C. Farense and resumed his career in the second level, representing old acquaintances Louletano and Torreense.

Late in 1994, after having helped Vitória de Setúbal finish sixth in the top flight, Esteves earned himself a transfer to S.L. Benfica, but never settled with his hometown club, playing for a third side in the campaign as he was loaned to England's Birmingham City, although his only match for Blues was a 45 minute appearance in the Auto Windscreens Shield against Leyton Orient. He returned to Portugal in the following summer, spending two years with Benfica neighbours C.F. Os Belenenses also in the top tier, and closed out his career at 33 after spells in Asia, with K-League's Daewoo Royals and in the Chinese Jia-A League with Beijing Guoan FC.

Coaching career
Esteves began working as a coach in 2001, starting with Associação Desportiva Fazendense and going on to be in charge of Grupo Desportivo Alcochetense and C.D. Olivais e Moscavide in the following two years. In December 2008 he was appointed at G.D. Fabril, and never managed in higher than division three.

References

External links

1967 births
Living people
Footballers from Lisbon
Portuguese footballers
Association football midfielders
Primeira Liga players
Liga Portugal 2 players
S.C.U. Torreense players
S.C. Olhanense players
Louletano D.C. players
S.C. Farense players
Vitória F.C. players
S.L. Benfica footballers
C.F. Os Belenenses players
Birmingham City F.C. players
K League 1 players
Busan IPark players
Beijing Guoan F.C. players
Portuguese expatriate footballers
Expatriate footballers in England
Expatriate footballers in South Korea
Expatriate footballers in China
Portuguese expatriate sportspeople in England
Portuguese expatriate sportspeople in South Korea
Portuguese expatriate sportspeople in China
Portuguese football managers
S.U. Sintrense managers
F.C. Maia managers
S.C. Farense managers